Jackie Moran (January 26, 1923 – September 20, 1990) was an American movie actor who, between 1936 and 1946, appeared in over thirty films, primarily in teenage roles.

Early life and Hollywood career 
A native of Mattoon, Illinois, John E. Moran first sang in a church choir. He was discovered by Mary Pickford who convinced his mother to take him to Hollywood for a screen test in 1935. Renamed Jackie Moran, he was subsequently cast in a number of substantial supporting roles. He became well-known with the 1938 release of David O. Selznick's production The Adventures of Tom Sawyer. The 93-minute big-budget Technicolor film presented Moran as Huckleberry Finn to Tommy Kelly's Tom Sawyer. Jackie Moran received critical praise for his natural acting style.

Jackie Moran went on to star in several youth-oriented films for low-budget and poverty-row studios, such as Republic and Monogram. His most frequent co-star was the one-year-younger Marcia Mae Jones, who appeared with him in eleven films, also including Tom Sawyer, where Jones had the relatively minor part of Tom Sawyer's cousin Mary. They also played supporting roles in the Deanna Durbin vehicle Mad About Music.  They subsequently played in four Monogram tributes to life in idealized pre-World War II rural America, 1938's Barefoot Boy and, in 1940, Tomboy, Haunted House and The Old Swimmin' Hole. The trio of 1940 films were directed by Robert F. McGowan, the former director of Our Gang in his final directorial assignment. Most of Jackie and Marcia Mae's remaining five films cast them in major supporting roles. Their final entry, after a two-year break, was the 1943 Republic musical Nobody's Darling, one of the first films helmed by Anthony Mann.

Moran appeared in a cameo in Gone with the Wind (1939) where he played the son of Dr. Meade, furious about his brother's death as a soldier, and wanting to join the Confederate Army himself so he can "kill all those Yankees." Jackie also had a co-starring role with Buster Crabbe in Universal's well-known 12-chapter serial Buck Rogers in which he was third-billed as Buck's young friend, Buddy Wade. Jackie's next 1939 release was the Hardy Family-like Everybody's Hobby, while the last, Spirit of Culver, a remake of 1932's military-school film Tom Brown of Culver, teamed him with two former top child stars Jackie Cooper and Freddie Bartholomew. Jackie Moran did not serve in the military during the war and continued to act in movies, including one final appearance in a top quality film, Selznick's Since You Went Away (1944) where he played a grocer's son who exchanges bashful glances with Shirley Temple. The movie was one of five Oscar nominees for Best Picture (it eventually lost to Going My Way).

Moran ended his screen career in 1945-1946 with a collection of teenage musical comedies at Columbia and Monogram. He was the title character in Monogram's comedy-mystery There Goes Kelly, and co-starred with exuberant young actress June Preisser in Columbia's Let's Go Steady and Monogram's Junior Prom, Freddie Steps Out and High School Hero. The last three were part of a series which, in addition to Jackie Moran and June Preisser, starred Freddie Stewart, Warren Mills, Frankie Darro and Noel Neill.

Later life 
Jackie Moran's final movie role was in Columbia's 1946 college drama Betty Co-Ed. Accounts differ as to his occupations in the remaining forty-four years of his life. His obituaries stated that he became a screenwriter for B movies in the 1950s, but no specific titles were indicated. It was also written that he wrote songs. In the 1960s, a screenwriter using Jackie's real name, John E. Moran, worked extensively with Russ Meyer, notably on the films Faster, Pussycat! Kill! Kill!, Good Morning and... Goodbye!, Common Law Cabin, and Wild Gals of the Naked West, also playing small roles in the latter two films. The credits of the two are occasionally combined, but there is no confirmation that they are the same person. The obituaries also stated that in his later years, Jackie Moran worked in public relations for the Roman Catholic Diocese of Chicago.

Moran moved to Greenfield, Massachusetts in 1984 and wrote a novel, Six Step House. Six years after his arrival, he died of lung cancer in the town's Franklin Medical Center at the age of 67. As requested in his will, Jackie Moran's ashes were scattered on the backstretch of the Del Mar Racetrack, a thoroughbred horse racing facility in Del Mar, California.

Filmography 

 And So They Were Married (1936) - Tommy Blake
 Counterfeit (1936) - Duckfoot (uncredited)
 Valiant Is the Word for Carrie (1936) - Paul Darnley (as a Child)
 Outcast (1937) - Freddie Simmerson
 Michael O'Halloran (1937) - Michael O'Halloran
 The Adventures of Tom Sawyer (1938) - Huckleberry Finn
 Mad About Music (1938) - Tommy
 Arson Gang Busters (1938) - Jimmy Riler
 Mother Carey's Chickens (1938) - Gilbert Carey
 Barefoot Boy (1938) - Billy Whittaker
 The Spirit of Culver (1939) - Perkins
 Buck Rogers (1939) - George 'Buddy' Wade
 Everybody's Hobby (1939) - Robert Leslie
 Meet Dr. Christian (1939) - Don Hewitt
 Gone with the Wind (1939) - Phil Meade
 Tomboy (1940) - Steve
 Anne of Windy Poplars (1940) - Boy
 Haunted House (1940) - Jimmie Atkins
 The Old Swimmin' Hole (1940) - Chris Carter
 The Gang's All Here (1941) - Chick Daly
 Let's Go Collegiate (1941) - Tad
 Nobody's Darling (1943) - Charles Grant Jr.
 Henry Aldrich Haunts a House (1943) - Whit Bidecker
 Andy Hardy's Blonde Trouble (1944) - Spud (uncredited)
 Since You Went Away (1944) - Johnny Mahoney
 Song of the Open Road (1944) - Jack Moran
 Janie (1944) - Mickey - a Sailor
 Three Little Sisters (1944) - Chad Jones
 Let's Go Steady (1945) - Roy Spencer
 There Goes Kelly (1945) - Jimmy Kelly
 Hop Harrigan America's Ace of the Airways (1946) - Fraser
 Junior Prom (1946) - Jimmy Forrest
 Freddie Steps Out (1946) - Jimmy Forrest
 High School Hero (1946) - Jimmy Forrest
 Betty Co-Ed (1946) - Ted Harris
 Wild Gals of the Naked West (1962)
 Dingle, Dangle (1966)
 Common Law Cabin (1967) - Dewey Hoople
 Code Name: Raw-Hide (1972) - The Chief (final film role)

References

External links

 
 Jackie Moran obituary in The New York Times
 Los Angeles Times obit

1923 births
1990 deaths
American male child actors
American male screenwriters
Male actors from Illinois
Deaths from lung cancer in Massachusetts
People from Greenfield, Massachusetts
People from Mattoon, Illinois
20th-century American male actors
Screenwriters from Illinois
Screenwriters from Massachusetts
20th-century American male writers
20th-century American screenwriters